Great Britain and Northern Ireland competed, under the name Great Britain, at the 2016 Summer Paralympics in Rio de Janeiro, Brazil, from 7 September to 18 September 2016. The first places for which the team qualified were for six athletes in sailing events.

Administration
On 19 November 2014, the British Paralympic Association announced the appointment of Penny Briscoe as chef-de-mission to the British Paralympic team at Rio 2016. The Association's President Tim Reddish OBE was Head of Delegation, while CEO Tim Hollingsworth was Secretary General. On 3 August 2015, the BPA announced that Anna Scott-Marshall would replace Jane Jones as Deputy Secretary General of the British delegation.

 Tim Reddish OBE – Head of Delegation
 Penny Briscoe – Chef de Mission
 David Courell – Deputy Chef de Mission
 Georgina Sharples – Deputy Chef de Mission
 Tim Hollingsworth – Secretary General
 Anna Scott-Marshall – Deputy Secretary General
 Dr Stuart Miller – Chief Medical Officer
 Tash Carpenter – Chief Press Officer

Funding
As with previous Games UK Sport was the body responsible for allocating elite funding for Paralympic sports. In December 2012 a record £347 million of funding for Olympic and Paralympic athletes was announced with the aim of becoming the first nation in recent history to win more medals at the Games following being the host nation.

Three sports, wheelchair fencing, goalball and five-a-side football, had all their funding withdrawn, a decision that was confirmed following an appeal process. On the 5 February 2015, UK Sport announced that funding would be restored to wheelchair fencing for the Rio cycle.

Medal and performance targets

UK Sport targeted at least 121 medals for Rio to surpass the 120 medals won at the 2012 Games in London, setting the target range as 113-165 medals. The GB squad surpassed this target on 16 September and finished with a total of 147 medals, which was their best medal haul since the 1988 Summer Paralympics in Seoul, South Korea. The team won medals in 15 sports, and won gold across 11 sports, which eclipsed even China who medalled in 13 sports and topped the podium in 9 sports. It was only the second time that a country had won gold medals across so many sports matching the achievement of China in 2008.

Competitors

Dame Sarah Storey DBE, the track and road cyclist, and Wheelchair Basketball player Simon Munn participated at their seventh Paralympic Games. Storey celebrated this achievement by becoming Great Britain’s most successful female paralympian.

The youngest athlete on the team was thirteen-year-old swimmer Abby Kane. Anne Dunham MBE was the oldest member of the team at 67, bringing four Games worth of experience to a team of equestrian riders. Both athletes won medals during 11 days of competition.

The following is the list of number of competitors in the Games. Note that guides in Athletics and Para-Triathlon, competition partners in Boccia, and pilots in Cycling are counted as athletes:

|  style="text-align:left; width:78%; vertical-align:top;"|

Disability classifications

Every participant at the Paralympics has their disability grouped into one of five disability categories; amputation, the condition may be congenital or sustained through injury or illness; cerebral palsy; wheelchair athletes, there is often overlap between this and other categories; visual impairment, including blindness; Les autres, any physical disability that does not fall strictly under one of the other categories, for example dwarfism or multiple sclerosis. Each Paralympic sport then has its own classifications, dependent upon the specific physical demands of competition. Events are given a code, made of numbers and letters, describing the type of event and classification of the athletes competing. Some sports, such as athletics, divide athletes by both the category and severity of their disabilities, other sports, for example swimming, group competitors from different categories together, the only separation being based on the severity of the disability.

Medallists

The following British competitors won medals at the Games. In the 'by discipline' sections below, medallists' names are in bold.

|  style="text-align:left; width:95%; vertical-align:top;"|

|  style="text-align:left; width:22%; vertical-align:top;"|

Medals by sport

Medals by date

Medals by gender

Multiple medallists

The following Team GB competitors won several medals at the 2016 Paralympic Games.

*Kadeena Cox's gold medal in the 500m time trial made her the first Great Britain paralympian to win medals in two different sports in the same Games for 28 years.

Archery

Great Britain earned nine spots for Rio based on their performance at the 2015 World Archery Para Championships.  The team earned 3 spots in the compound open event, 2 for men and 1 for a woman,  earned 2 spots in the recurve open, 1 man and 1 woman, earned 4 spots in the W1 event, 2 men and 2 woman. The first two spots were earned by Jo Frith and John Walker, with 2004 Paralympian John Cavanagh winning the country's third spot. Jessica Stretton's bronze medal at the event gave the country their fourth spot. John Stubbs MBE and Mel Clarke then earned the country's fifth and sixth spots. Other archers assisting in qualifying spots included Michael Hall, David Phillips and Tania Nadarajah. In April 2016, Nathan MacQueen secured a tenth quota for Great Britain at the Continental Qualifying Tournament held during the 2016 European Para-Archery Championships. On 21 June, the British Paralympic Association announced the names of the ten archers who will represent Team GB in Rio. On 9 July, it was announced that the World Archery Federation had given a bipartite invitation to Vicky Jenkins to compete in the women's compound W1 event.

The qualifiers in the mixed team events are also entitled to compete in the individual events.

Individual

Team

Athletics

Great Britain secured a first quota in athletics for Rio when David Weir finished second in his classification at the 2015 IPC Marathon World Championships in London. Another 15 athletes in the following list secured quotas for Great Britain by finishing in the first two places in their events at the 2015 IPC Athletics World Championships (note only one quota may be awarded per athlete). The British Paralympic Association announced the first tranche of thirteen athletes to be selected for Rio on 23 June 2016. Kadeena Cox had secured a second quota for Team GB in the women's T37 100m but has since been reclassified as a T38 athlete. On 26 July, the British Paralympic Association announced the remaining members of the British athletics team to compete in Rio.  F55 discus thrower Claire Harvey was forced to withdraw from the team due to injury.

Men

Track

Field

Women

Track

Field

Boccia

Great Britain achieved qualification in the BC1/2 class by winning the gold medal at the 2015 European Teams & Pairs Championships. Great Britain secured qualification for Rio in the BC3 and BC4 Pairs by finishing among the top four previously unqualified nations when the final BISFed world rankings were announced at the end of April 2016. As Great Britain has won quotas in all of the events they must include at least two women competitors across the three team combinations. On 15 July 2016, the British Paralympic Association announced the names of the ten athletes who will represent Team GB in Rio.

Individual

Key – CP = Competition Partner

Pairs and teams

Cycling

Great Britain secured one quota place in both men's and women's events in Rio by finishing 7th and 2nd respectively in the NPC UCI Para-Cycling European Nations ranking lists as at 31 December 2014. Further quotas were gained from world ranking points in April 2016. On 17 June 2016, the British Paralympic Association announced a team of eleven cyclists and four pilots.

On 1 August, the final two cyclists were announced – dual Paralympian Kadeena Cox, aiming to be the first British paralympian to compete in two sports at the same Games since 1992 and the first to win medals in two sports since Isabel Newstead MBE (athletics and shooting) in 1988, was added to the cycling team for both track and road races, having already been named in the athletics team, and Louis Rolfe was added to the track team.

On 24 August, three more exceptional announcements were made following the decision by the International Paralympic Committee, upheld by the Court of Arbitration for Sport to exclude Russia from the 2016 Paralympic Games as a consequence of the state-sponsored doping programme uncovered in the McLaren Report. Paralympics GB announced seven new athletes who inherited quota places vacated by the Russian team, among them cyclists Crystal Lane, James Ball and his pilot, former Olympian Craig MacLean MBE.

Road

Track

The Women's 500 metres C1-3 time trial is a factored event. Although finishing 5th after factoring, Megan Giglia's time is recognised as a world record in her classification.

Equestrian

Great Britain were one of three nations to qualify a team for dressage via their results at the 2014 FEI World Equestrian Games, where Lee Pearson CBE, Sophie Christiansen OBE, Sophie Wells MBE and Natasha Baker MBE won gold in the team event. On 8 March 2016, the FEI confirmed that Great Britain had achieved an additional quota in the individual dressage competition. The five riders selected by the British Paralympic Association to represent Great Britain in Rio were announced on 14 July.

Individual

Team

* Indicates the three best individual scores that count towards the team total.

Although not competing in the team event, Lee Pearson CBE rode as an individual in the Grade Ib Team Test, finishing first with a score of 75.280.

Football 7-a-side

Great Britain secured qualification for Rio by finishing fifth at the 2015 Cerebral Palsy Football World Championships.

The draw for the tournament was held on May 6 at the 2016 Pre Paralympic Tournament in Salou, Spain.  Great Britain was put into Group A with Ukraine, Brazil and Ireland.  The tournament where the draw took place featured 7 of the 8 teams participating in Rio.  It was the last major preparation event ahead of the Rio Games for all teams participating.  Great Britain finished fourth, after losing 2 – 3 to the Netherlands in the 3rd place match.

Going into the Rio Games, England was ranked seventh in the world, while Scotland was ninth, Northern Ireland was thirteenth and Wales was unranked.  No Great Britain team was ranked. On 13 June 2016, the British Paralympic Association announced the selection of the fourteen members of the British 7-a-side squad. The team included several players from Scotland.  These were FT7 classified players Martin Hickman, Jonathan Paterson and David Porcher.

Group play

Classification 5–6

Judo

On 11 February 2016, the British Paralympic Association announced the names of the four judokas selected to fill the quotas secured by Great Britain at Rio2016. A fifth was added on 24 August 2016 following the exclusion of Russian athletes for state-sponsored doping.

Paracanoeing

Great Britain secured four quotas at the 2015 ICF Canoe Sprint World Championships where paracanoeing formed part of the programme. Britain secured further quotas in the Men's KL1 and KL2 classes at the 2016 ICF Paracanoe Sprint World Championships giving them representation in all six events at the Games in Rio. The squad of six athletes was named in June 2016 and includes Jeanette Chippington who has won 12 Paralympic swimming medals at previous Games, Emma Wiggs who competed in 2012 in the sport of sitting volleyball and 2012 rower Nick Beighton.

Legend: FA = Qualified to final (medal); SF = Qualified to semifinal. PB = Paralympic Best time.

Paratriathlon

Great Britain secured a quota in the women's PT4 classification at the 2015 ITU World Paratriathlon Championships. In March 2016, Lauren Steadman and Alison Patrick met the automatic selection criteria set by British Triathlon by winning gold medals at an ITU World Paratriathlon event held in South Africa. Their selection still has to be verified by the British Paralympic Association in June when the other members of the paratriathlon team will also be selected. On 15 July 2016, the British Paralympic Association announced the selection of eleven athletes to compete in the inaugural Olympic paratriathlon competition in Rio.

Lauren Steadman participated in the Rio test event, winning the PT4 class in a time of 1:08:46.

Powerlifting

Great Britain secured four quotas for Rio 2016. On 18 April 2016, the British Paralympic Association announced the four powerlifters who have been selected to represent Great Britain in Rio.

Rowing

Great Britain secured qualification in all four paralympic classes at the 2015 World Rowing Championships. On 30 June 2016, the British Paralympic Association announced the British rowing squad selected for Rio.

Legend: FA = Final A (medal); FB = Final B (non-medal); R = Repechage. WB = World Best time, PB = Paralympic Best time.

Sailing

Great Britain qualified a boat for all three sailing classes at the Games through their results at the 2014 Disabled Sailing World Championships held in Halifax, Nova Scotia, Canada. 2012 Summer Paralympics gold medallist Helena Lucas secured a British place in the 2.4mR event by winning the silver medal at the Championships; Alexandra Rickham and Niki Birrell won silver to qualify a boat in the SKUD 18-class and a crew also qualified for the three-person Sonar class. On 28 April 2015, Helena Lucas became the first British athlete to be selected to compete at either the Olympic or Paralympic Games in Rio when she was chosen to represent Great Britain in the 2.4mR sailing class. On 1 March 2016, Paralympics GB announced the selection of the five sailors who will represent Great Britain in the SKUD and Sonar classes in Rio.

Shooting

Great Britain secured three quota places at the 2014 IPC Shooting World Championships. Britain secured three further quotas at the 2015 IPC Shooting World Cup in Croatia. Further quotas were achieved at the World Cup event held in the USA later in 2015. On 8 April 2016, the IPC announced that Issy Bailey was one of eleven shooters to be issued with a Bipartite invitation to compete in Rio. On 10 June 2016, the British Paralympic Association announced the names of the ten shooters who will represent Team GB in Rio. Great Britain had secured a second quota in the 10 m air pistol SH1 class but following the death in May of Roy Carter this was not taken up.

Swimming

Great Britain secured eleven quotas at the 2015 IPC Swimming World Championships after finishing in the top two places in Paralympic class disciplines. On the 16 May 2016, the British Paralympic Association announced a squad of 31 swimmers to compete in Rio. Although named in the initial squad, injury and health problems forced Tully Kearney to pull out a few weeks before the Games began.

Men

Women

Table tennis

Rob Davies secured qualification for Rio by winning a gold medal at the 2015 Para Table Tennis European Championships. In November 2015, Aaron McKibbin achieved qualification for Rio by winning a gold medal at the China Open. In addition to the two places already achieved Great Britain secured a further ten quotas based on the ITTF Para Table Tennis rankings as at 31 December 2015. On 8 March 2016, the British Paralympic Association confirmed the selection of the twelve table tennis players who will represent Great Britain in Rio.

Men

Women

Teams

Wheelchair basketball

Great Britain's men's and women's wheelchair basketball teams secured qualification for Rio at the 2015 European Wheelchair Basketball Championship. Great Britain named their men's squad on 20 June 2016.

Men's tournament
During the draw, Brazil had the choice of which group they wanted to be in.  They were partnered with Spain, who would be in the group Brazil did not select.  Brazil chose Group B, which included Iran, the United States, Great Britain, Germany and Algeria.  That left Spain in Group A with Australia, Canada, Turkey, the Netherlands and Japan.

Group play

Quarterfinal

Semifinal

Bronze medal game

Women's tournament
As hosts, Brazil got to choose which group they were put into.  They were partnered with Algeria, who would be put in the group they did not chose.  Brazil chose Group A, which included Canada, Germany, Great Britain and Argentina.  Algeria ended up in Group B with the United States, the Netherlands, France and China.

Group play

Quarterfinal

Semifinal

Bronze medal game

Wheelchair fencing

Great Britain qualified two athletes to compete in wheelchair fencing via the IWASF world rankings as at 28 May 2016. On 5 July 2016, the British Paralympic Association confirmed the selections of Piers Gilliver and Dimitri Coutya to represent Team GB in Rio.

Wheelchair rugby

Great Britain's national wheelchair rugby team secured qualification for Rio at the 2015 International Wheelchair Rugby Federation European Championship. On 12 May 2016, Paralympics GB announced the squad of twelve wheelchair rugby players who will represent Great Britain in Rio.

Great Britain was scheduled to open play in Rio against Australia on September 14.  Their second game was scheduled to be against Canada on September 15.  Their final game of group play was against Brazil on September 16. Great Britain entered the tournament ranked number five in the world.

Group play

Classification 5–6

Wheelchair tennis

Great Britain qualified for ten out of a possible eleven individual quotas in the wheelchair tennis events in Rio based on the ITF rankings as at 23 May 2016. On 28 June 2016, the British Paralympic Association confirmed the ten athletes who will represent Team GB in Rio.

Singles

Doubles

See also
Great Britain at the 2016 Summer Olympics

References

Nations at the 2016 Summer Paralympics
2016
2016 in British sport